Trevor Chibvongodze (born 13 November 1996) is a Zimbabwean cricketer. He made his first-class debut for Mid West Rhinos in the 2017–18 Logan Cup on 10 October 2017. Prior to his first-class debut, he was part of Zimbabwe's squad for the 2016 Under-19 Cricket World Cup.

He made his List A debut for Mid West Rhinos in the 2017–18 Pro50 Championship on 29 April 2018. In December 2020, he was selected to play for the Rhinos in the 2020–21 Logan Cup.

References

External links
 

1996 births
Living people
Zimbabwean cricketers
Place of birth missing (living people)
Mid West Rhinos cricketers